Ron Saint Germain (alternate spellings Ron St. Germain, Ron Saint-Germaine and similar) is an American record producer, audio engineer, and mixer born in post-war Frankfurt, Germany, into a career Air Force family.

Prior to his career in music production and engineering he was a musician, actor, and singer. Saint Germain's music business career spans over forty-five years. He began learning the art of recording at The Record Plant and Mediasound Studios in New York City. Some of his colleagues during those formative years were Tony Bongiovi, Bob Clearmountain, Harvey Goldberg, Mike Barbiero, Joe Gastwirt and Michael Brauer.

Since going independent as a producer, engineer and mixer in 1977 his work has amassed over 100 gold and platinum awards, selling well over a quarter billion units, garnering 19 Grammy nominations with 14 wins and numerous American Music and MTV Awards for the artists he has worked with. He has also mixed live and recorded in venues from CBGB to the 1980 Winter Olympics, Ronald Reagan’s Inauguration Ceremonies and the John F. Kennedy Center for the Performing Arts.

Among some of the most notable artists he has worked with are Jimi Hendrix, Aretha Franklin, Whitney Houston, Diana Ross, Michael Jackson, Smokey Robinson, Ashford & Simpson, Mick Jagger, U2, Muse, Bad Brains, Living Colour, 311, Tool, Soundgarden, Sonic Youth, Creed, The Cure, Ziggy Marley, the Red Hot Chili Peppers, Foreigner, Kraftwerk, Duran Duran, Nels Cline, Ornette Coleman, McCoy Tyner, Jackie McLean, Ben Goldberg, Kris Davis, Craig Taborn, The Last Poets and numerous others. He has much of his music work in film soundtracks, is active in Sound Design and is part of, 'A Moment In Time', a documentary film production company amomentintimefilms.com. Saint Germain continues his work traveling wherever it takes him, but does his mixing work at his private studio, Saint’s Place.

Discography
 I Against I by Bad Brains 
 Quickness by Bad Brains 
 Goo by Sonic Youth 
 Stain by Living Colour 
 311, From Chaos, Evolver, Don't Tread On Me, 311 Day 2006 (T.V. Special in 5.1) by 311 
 Cruzential by Kashmir  
 El Cielo by Dredg

He has had over 30 number 1 dance remixes (many with mixing partner Francois Kevorkian) such as "Hot Hot Hot!!!" and "Why Can't I Be You?" from the album Galore by The Cure, "Lucky in Love" and "Just Another Night" from the album She's the Boss by Mick Jagger, "Solid" from the album Solid by Ashford & Simpson.

Artists he has worked with include:

 Twiddle
 Nels Cline
 Muse
 Bad Brains
 311
 Tool
 Soundgarden
 U2
 Sonic Youth
 Mick Jagger
 Creed
 Living Colour
 Foreigner
 The Cult
 Terence Trent D'Arby
 Joydrop
 DMC
 Mos Def
 Breed 77
 Fishbone
 Alien Ant Farm
 Jimi Hendrix
 Red Hot Chili Peppers
 Killing Joke
 Kraftwerk
 Whitney Houston
 Diana Ross
 Michael Jackson
 Smokey Robinson
 Ashford & Simpson
 Nona Hendryx
 Chaka Kahn
 Al Jarreau
 Kool and the Gang
 Fatback
 Jimmy Castor Bunch
 Jean Michel Jarre
 Ziggy Marley
 Phillip Bailey & Phil Collins
 Jan Hammer
 Ornette Coleman
 McCoy Tyner
 Dexter Gordon
 Steven Stills
 Scott Stapp
 Lou Reed
 Warren Zevon
 Buffalo Tom
 Face to Face
 Boy Hits Car
 Pepper
 Michael Bolton
 Dan Hartman
 Modern West
 Rupert Holmes
 Steve Earl
 Snuff 
 Damien Saez
 Keziah Jones
 Ric Ocasek
 Cat Stevens
 Paquito D'Rivera
 Ronald Shannon Jackson
 Bobby Previte
 Tim Berne
 Joey Baron
 Paul Motian
 Jim Black
 Dan Weiss
 Bill Frisell
 Kris Davis
 Craig Taborn
 Uri Caine
 Hank Roberts
 Barbara Sukowa & the X Patsy's
 The Last Poets
 Mark Dresser
 Ingrid Laubrock 
 Chris Lightcap
 Ben Goldberg
 Ron Miles
 Cory Smythe
 Marc Ribot's Ceramic Dog
 Stephan Crump
 Jalal Mansur Nuriddin
 Stuwart Matthewman
 Steven Triantafillis
 Dave Eggar
 Chuck Palmer
 Daniel Sadownick
 David Fiuczynski
 Damien Saez
 No One is Innocent
 Brian Druxx

References

External links

Year of birth missing (living people)
Living people
people from Frankfurt
Record producers from New York (state)
People from New York (state)
American audio engineers